Amblyseiulella is a genus of mites in the Phytoseiidae family.

Species
 Amblyseiulella amanoi Ehara, in Ehara, Okada & Kato 1994
 Amblyseiulella baltazarae Corpuz-Raros, 1995
 Amblyseiulella chombongenis Ryu & Lee, 1995
 Amblyseiulella domatorum (Schicha, 1993)
 Amblyseiulella gapudi Corpuz-Raros, 1995
 Amblyseiulella heveae (Oudemans, 1930)
 Amblyseiulella hyauliangensis (Gupta, 1986)
 Amblyseiulella nucifera (Gupta, 1979)
 Amblyseiulella odowdi Ryu & Lee, 1995
 Amblyseiulella omei (Wu & Li, 1984)
 Amblyseiulella paraheveae (Wu & Ou, 2002)
 Amblyseiulella prunii (Liang & Ke, 1982)
 Amblyseiulella thoi Ehara, 2002
 Amblyseiulella xizangensis (Wu, 1997)
 Amblyseiulella yaeyamana Ehara & Amano, 2002

References

Phytoseiidae
Acari genera